Henry Shirley may refer to:

Henry Shirley (dramatist) (died 1627), English dramatist, murdered by Sir Edward Bishopp, 2nd Baronet
Henry Shirley, 3rd Earl Ferrers (1691–1745), English nobleman and lunatic
Henry Shirley (diplomat) on List of ambassadors of the United Kingdom to Russia
Arthur Shirley (Henry Raymond Shirley, 1886–1967), Australian actor, writer, producer and director 
Henry G. Shirley (1874–1941), Commissioner of the Virginia Department of Highways